The Porta San Paolo (English: Saint Paul Gate) is one of the southern gates in the 3rd-century Aurelian Walls of Rome, Italy. The Via Ostiense Museum is housed within the gatehouse.
It is in the Ostiense quarter; just to the west is the Roman Pyramid of Cestius, an Egyptian-style pyramid, and beyond that is the Protestant Cemetery.

History 
Via Ostiense was an important arterial road, as evidenced by the fact that upon entering the gate of the same name, the road split, with one direction leading to the famous Emporium, the great market of Rome.

The gatehouse is flanked by two cylindrical towers, and has two entrances, which had been covered by a second, single-opening gate, built in front of the first by the Byzantine general Belisarius (530s–540s).

The structure is due to Maxentius, in the 4th century, but the two towers were heightened by Honorius. Later, it was renamed to the Italian , because it was the exit of Rome that led to the Basilica of St. Paul Outside the Walls.

In 549, Rome was under siege; the Ostrogoths of Totila entered through this gate, because of the treason of the Isaurian garrison. 

On 10 September 1943, two days after the armistice between the Allies and Italy had been agreed, Italian military and civil forces tried to block German seizure of the city, with 570 casualties.

See also

Notes

References

External links 
 Further information 

Buildings and structures completed in the 4th century
Museums in Rome
History museums in Italy
San Paolo
Rome R. XX Testaccio